Bristol was a two-member constituency, used to elect members to the House of Commons in the Parliaments of England (to 1707), Great Britain (1707–1800), and the United Kingdom (from 1801). The constituency existed until Bristol was divided into single member constituencies in 1885.

Boundaries
The historic port city of Bristol is located in what is now the South West Region of England. It straddles the border between the historic geographical counties of Gloucestershire and Somerset. It was usually accounted as a Gloucestershire borough in the later part of the 19th and the 20th centuries.

The parliamentary borough of Bristol was represented in Parliament from the 13th century, as one of the most important population centres in the Kingdom. Namier and Brooke comment that in 1754 the city was the second largest in the Kingdom and had the third largest electorate for an urban seat.

From the 1885 United Kingdom general election the city was divided into four single member seats. These were Bristol East, Bristol North, Bristol South and Bristol West.

Members of Parliament

The use of Roman numerals in the list below denotes different politicians of the same name, not that the individuals concerned would have used the Roman numerals as part of their name.

Non Partisan denotes that the politician concerned is not known to have been associated with a party (not necessarily that he was not). Whilst Whig and Tory societies in the city continued to nominate candidates in the last half of the 18th century, the electoral labels used in Bristol had very little to do with what the MPs did in national politics.

Notes:-
 1 By 4 February 1536 David Broke had been elected vice Thomas Jubbes deceased. He was probably re-elected in the 1536 general election and certainly was at the 1539 and 1542 elections..
 2 A Peer of Ireland. He was created a Peer of England, as 1st Baron Butler, in 1666.
 3 Died 16 October 1677.
 4 Died 11 October 1685.
 5 Died 30 September 1739.
 6 Died 20 October 1742.
 7 Died 24 January 1756.
 8 Created a Peer of Ireland, as 1st Viscount Clare, in 1767.
 9 Died 30 December 1780.
 10 A Peer of Ireland, as 1st Baron Sheffield, created in 1781.
 11 Adopted a new surname of Bathurst, in 1804.
 12 Resigned.
 13 Died 10 March 1870.
 14 Election declared void on petition.

Elections
During the existence of this constituency, Bristol was a city with the status of being a county of itself. That meant that the city was not subject to the administration of the officials of the geographic counties in which it was situated. In electoral terms it meant that the voters for the parliamentary borough included those qualified on the same 40 shilling freeholder franchise as that for a county constituency. Other electors qualified as freemen of the borough. These were the ancient right franchises, applicable to Bristol, preserved by the Reform Act 1832, which also introduced a broader occupation franchise for all borough constituencies.

Bristol was a fairly partisan constituency in the eighteenth century with two rival clubs - the Union Club for the Whigs and the Steadfast Society for the Tories.

The bloc vote electoral system was used in two seat elections and first past the post for single member by-elections. Each voter had up to as many votes as there were seats to be filled. Votes had to be cast by a spoken declaration, in public, at the hustings (until the secret ballot was introduced in 1872).

Namier and Brooke, in The House of Commons 1754-1790, estimated the electorate of Bristol to number about 5,000. When registration of electors was introduced in 1832 the city had 10,315 names on the electoral register.

Note on percentage change calculations: Where there was only one candidate of a party in successive elections, for the same number of seats, change is calculated on the party percentage vote. Where there was more than one candidate, in one or both successive elections for the same number of seats, then change is calculated on the individual percentage vote.

Note on sources: The information for the election results given below is taken from Sedgwick 1715–1754, Namier and Brooke 1754–1790, Stooks Smith 1790-1832 and from Craig thereafter. Where Stooks Smith gives additional information or differs from the other sources this is indicated in a note after the result.

Elections in the 1710s

 Note (1715): Although the Whig candidates received fewer votes than the Tory ones, the Returning Officer declared them elected and the House of Commons did not hear the petitions against the return; so Daines and Earle continued to sit throughout the Parliament.

Elections in the 1720s

 Note (1727): William Hart (Tory) was a candidate, but he did not go to a poll after Mr Elton paid him £1,000 to cover his election expenses.
 Elton became the 2nd Baronet, upon the death of his father (the MP of the same name elected in 1722) in 1728.

Elections in the 1730s

 Death of Coster

 Note (1759): Southwell was an Opposition Whig

Elections in the 1740s

 Death of EltonElections in the 1750s

 Note (1754): Nugent 2,601; Philips 2,165. (Source: Stooks Smith) Death of Beckford Seat vacated by appointment of Craggs-Nugent as a Vice Treasurer of IrelandElections in the 1760s

 Seat vacated by appointment of Craggs-Nugent as First Commissioner of the Board of Trade and Plantations Creation of Craggs-Nugent as the 1st Viscount Clare, in the Peerage of Ireland, in 1767 Seat vacated by appointment of Viscount Clare as a Vice Treasurer of IrelandElections in the 1770s

 Note (1774): 5,384 voted. Lord Clare resigned on the second day when Mr. Burke was first proposed. Mr. Burke was at the time in Malton, for which place he had been returned when the deputation arrived to invite him to Bristol, where he arrived on the sixth day's poll. (Source: Stooks Smith)Elections in the 1780s

 Note (1780): Lippincott 3,518; Burke 0. Mr. Rich. Combe, late member of Aldeburgh, was a Candidate, but died the day before the commencement of the poll. (Source: Stooks Smith) Death of Lippincott Note (1784): 6,094 voted. (Source: Stooks Smith)Elections in the 1790s

 Note (1796): Poll 1 day. (Source: Stooks Smith)Elections in the 1800s
 Members of the last Parliament of Great Britain, continued in office for the first Parliament of the United Kingdom from 1 January 1801 Seat vacated on the appointment of Bragge as Treasurer of the Navy Note (1802): Sir Frederick Eden was a candidate, but retired before the election. (Source: Stooks Smith) Seat vacated on the appointment of Bragge as Secretary at War Bragge changed his surname to Bathurst in 1804Elections in the 1810s
 Seat vacated on the appointment of Bathurst as Chancellor of the Duchy of Lancaster on 23 June 1812 Note (1812 by-election): Poll 13 days; 2,142 electors voted. (Source: Stooks Smith) Note (1812): Poll 10 days; 4,389 electors cast 7,415 votes. (Source: Stooks Smith) Note (1818): Poll 5 days; 4,121 electors cast 7,320 votes. (Source: Stooks Smith)Elections in the 1820s

Elections in the 1830s

 Note (1830): Poll 4 days (Source: Stooks Smith)Elections in the 1840s

 

Elections in the 1850s

 

 Note (1852): From this election the number of electors who voted is unknown, so the number of votes cast is divided by two, and the resultant figure is used to calculate an estimated minimum turnout. To the extent that electors did not cast both their possible votes the turnout figure will be an underestimate. 

Elections in the 1860s

 

 Resignation of Peto McCalmont reports that Miles was unseated on petition, but that no new writ was issued before the 1868 general election. Craig also reports the election was voided.Elections in the 1870s
 Death of Berkeley Election of Robinson declared void on petition Swing from Liberal to Conservative 

 Resignation of HodgsonElections in the 1880s

 

 Constituency abolished - city split into four divisions (1885)See also
List of former United Kingdom Parliament constituencies
Unreformed House of Commons

References

Bibliography
 Boundaries of Parliamentary Constituencies 1885-1972, compiled and edited by F.W.S. Craig (Parliamentary Reference Publications 1972)
 British Parliamentary Election Results 1832-1885, compiled and edited by F.W.S. Craig (The Macmillan Press 1977)
 McCalmont's Parliamentary Poll Book: British Election Results 1832-1918 (8th edition, The Harvester Press 1971)
 
 
 
 The Parliaments of England by Henry Stooks Smith (1st edition published in three volumes 1844-50), second edition edited (in one volume) by F.W.S. Craig (Political Reference Publications 1973) out of copyright Who's Who of British Members of Parliament: Volume I 1832-1885'', edited by M. Stenton (The Harvester Press 1976)

Parliamentary constituencies in South West England (historic)
Constituencies of the Parliament of the United Kingdom established in 1295
Constituencies of the Parliament of the United Kingdom disestablished in 1885
Parliamentary constituencies in Bristol